Kristian Garup Meidell, sometimes just Garup Meidell (8 May 1866 – 25 July 1926) was a Norwegian barrister.

He was born in Nes i Hallingdal as a son of district stipendiary magistrate Frants Henrik Meidell and Olivia Annette Caroline Arntzen. In 1893 he married Kristine Marie Birkeland, a daughter of Supreme Court Justice Laurits Birkeland. Their son Arne Meidell became a known industrial leader. Another son, Frants, followed in his father's footsteps as a barrister.

Garup Meidell finished his secondary education in 1885 and graduated from the Royal Frederick University with the cand.jur. degree in 1890. He worked under his father before settling as an attorney in Kristiania in 1893. From 1896 he was a barrister with access to working with Supreme Court cases. Among others he worked as a lawyer for the Central Bank of Norway, and at his death he was described as one of the "best known jurists" in Norway's capital.

He notably took part in the liquidation of Den norske Discontobank in 1901 and Industribanken in 1902. He was also appointed by the state to the control committee of Andresens og Bergens Kreditbank, when this bank was placed under public administration in 1923. He chaired the supervisory council of Elektrisk Bureau, and was a board member of the Norwegian Bar Association. He died in July 1926 at Modum Bad.

References

1866 births
1926 deaths
People from Nes, Buskerud
Lawyers from Oslo
University of Oslo alumni